Crematogaster breviventris is a species of ant in tribe Crematogastrini. It was described by Santschi in 1920.

References

breviventris
Insects described in 1920
Taxa named by Felix Santschi